Tatoosh Island is a small island and small group of islands about  offshore (northwest) of Cape Flattery, which is on the northwestern tip of the Olympic Peninsula in Washington. The islands are part of the Makah Reservation and a part of Clallam County.
 
Historically, Tatoosh Island was inhabited seasonally by Makah fishing camps and employees of the United States Coast Guard, Weather Bureau, and Navy. Currently, there is no resident population on the islands.  Access to the island requires written permission of the Makah tribe. The island's name comes from a Makah chief known as Tatoosh (also Tatooche or Tetacus).

Tatoosh Island has been home to Cape Flattery Light, which overlooks the entrance to the Strait of Juan de Fuca, since December 28, 1857.

The whole island was added to the National Register of Historic Places in 1972.

Ecology
Because of its isolation, climate, and location in the ecologically productive northeastern Pacific Ocean, Tatoosh Island is home to many nesting seabirds, several marine mammals, and a diverse community of marine plants and animals.  Beginning in 1967, Professor Robert T. Paine of the University of Washington and his colleagues have undertaken detailed studies of marine ecology on the island. In 1990, Julia Parrish came to the island after an invitation from one of Paine's students and began a long-term research study of sea birds on the island.

The research has revealed how species are linked to each other through a network of species interactions, and how environmental changes and species extinction are transmitted through the food web. Key ecological concepts explored by this research include keystone species, control by consumers and natural disturbances on ecosystem structure and spatial patterning, species interaction strength, body size-dependent population dynamics, and impacts of environmental changes such as ocean acidification and El Niño events on complex ecosystems.

Climate
Tatoosh Island has an extremely moderated oceanic climate (Köppen Cfb) with very cool but quite long summers, and long, moderate and wet winters. This is due to its exposed location for maritime winds that temper both heat and cold extremes year round.

Gallery

References

Tatoosh Island group: Blocks 2046 and 2047, Census Tract 9801, Clallam County, Washington United States Census Bureau
Paine, R. T.  1994.  Marine Rocky Shores and Community Ecology: An Experimentalist's Perspective.  Ecology Institute, Oldendorf/Luhe, Germany.

External links

 Photos and other items about Tatoosh Island from the Library of Congress
 History of Tatoosh Island from the University of Washington Libraries Digital Collections website
 Station TTIW1 - Tatoosh Island, WA from the National Data Buoy Center of the NOAA, with "sector pictures"
 Maps including Tatoosh Island, from the official Makah website
 Cape Flattery Tribal Scenic Byway from the Washington State Tourism website
 Photos of Cape Flattery Lighthouse and Helipad, from a commercial photographer's website
 Cape Flattery Lighthouse
 University of Washington Libraries Digital Collections – Makah Cultural and Research Center Online Museum Exhibit History and culture of the Makah tribe; includes images from Tatoosh Island.
 Research summaries, scientific articles, photographs of Tatoosh Island and its organisms, and a video interview of ecologists Cathy Pfister and Tim Wootton

Makah
Pacific islands of Washington (state)
Landforms of Clallam County, Washington
Uninhabited islands of Washington (state)
Chinook Jargon place names
Natural features on the National Register of Historic Places in Washington (state)
National Register of Historic Places in Clallam County, Washington
Washington placenames of Native American origin